Mikey Williams (born June 26, 2004) is an American high school basketball player from San Diego, California, who attends San Ysidro High School. He previously played for Vertical Academy, an extension of Lake Norman Christian High School, in North Carolina after originally attending and transferring from San Ysidro. He is a four-star recruit who has committed to play college basketball for the Memphis Tigers.

Early life
Williams first held a basketball when he was 11 months old and grew up playing under the guidance of his father and mother. In his childhood, he mainly played on an outdoor court in his apartment complex. In elementary school, Williams was often involved in fights with bullies. He worked as a ball boy for San Ysidro High School head coach Terry Tucker, who said that "he couldn't keep (Williams) out of the gym." In sixth grade while playing with the San Diego Sharks, Williams had his first official game dunk at 12 years old (April 15, 2017). He went on to play for the Malcolm Thomas All-Stars travel team. In seventh and eighth grade, he was ranked the number one player in the 2023 class by the Naismith National Youth All-American Report. In eighth grade, Williams joined the North Coast Blue Chips Amateur Athletic Union (AAU) team, where he rose to fame while playing alongside Bronny James, the son of basketball player LeBron James. In 2019, he played for the Compton Magic on the AAU circuit.

High school career
As a freshman, Williams played for San Ysidro High School in San Diego. On November 20, 2019, he made his high school debut, recording 41 points, five rebounds, four assists and four steals in a 98–46 win over El Cajon Valley High School. In his next game, an 85–77 victory over Mission Bay High School, Williams scored 50 points. On December 13, he scored a career-high 77 points, making nine three-pointers, in a 116–52 win over Kearny High School. He broke the CIF San Diego Section (CIF-SDS) single-game scoring record, previously held by Tyrone Shelley since 2005, and set the state freshman record for single-game scoring. On January 10, 2020, Williams recorded 35 points in a 103–71 loss to top 2020 recruit Evan Mobley and Rancho Christian School, one of the best high school teams in the country. He led San Ysidro to the CIF-SDS Division III title on February 27. As a freshman, Williams averaged 29.9 points, 6.7 rebounds and 4.9 assists per game and was named MaxPreps National Freshman of the Year.

Entering his sophomore season, Williams transferred to Lake Norman Christian School in Huntersville, North Carolina.

On April 9, 2022, Williams announced that he would return home to San Diego and play for his original high school, San Ysidro High School, for his senior year.

Recruiting
Williams is considered a four-star recruit in the 2023 class by 247Sports, ESPN and Rivals . He received offers from many NCAA Division I programs, including Arizona and Arizona State, before starting his high school career. In June 2020, Williams was offered by several historically black college and universities (HBCU) basketball programs after showing interest in playing for an HBCU on social media.

On November 5, 2022, Williams committed to play for the University of Memphis for head coach Penny Hardaway, starting in 2023–24.

Personal life
Williams' father, Mahlon, played basketball for Sweetwater High School, where he was an All-CIF-SDS selection. His mother, Charisse, played softball for Kearny High School and Hampton University.

Social media and endorsements
Williams has established a large social media following. He had over one million Instagram followers before starting high school. By the end of his freshman year of high school, he had almost 2 million  followers on Instagram, including musician Drake and basketball players LeBron James and Kevin Durant. Williams had accumulated 3.2 millions followers on Instagram by the end of his sophomore year in high school.

On July 22, 2021, Williams signed a contract with Excel Sports Management to pursue Name, Image and Likeness endorsement opportunities.

On October 28, 2021, Williams signed a multiyear endorsement deal with Puma, making him the first American high school basketball player to sign a sneaker deal with a global footwear company, at 17 years old.

Notes

References

2004 births
Living people
21st-century African-American sportspeople
African-American basketball players
American men's basketball players
Basketball players from San Diego
Point guards
Shooting guards